Stefan Zrinzo Azzopardi (born 23 September 1973) is a Maltese politician. He serves as Minister of Public Works and Planning in Prime Minister Robert Abela’s cabinet. He was first elected Member of Parliament for the 5th Electoral District (Birżebbuġa, Ħal Farruġ, Ħal Kirkop, Ħal Safi, Mqabba, Qrendi, Żurrieq) in 2017.

Career

Zrinzo Azzopardi is a lawyer, practicing mainly in commercial and civil law since 2000. In May 2013, he was appointed as Chairman of the Grand Harbour Regeneration Corporation, a position he held until January 2020. During his tenure, the Corporation was responsible for the completion of several projects designed by Architect Renzo Piano, including the new Parliament Building, the Capital City of Valletta’s entrance, and later Castille Square. The same Corporation oversaw an EU funded regeneration project in lower Valletta.

Politics
Zrinzo Azzopardi is a Partit Laburista member. He has been active in politics since 1996, within the local community and the party.

In 2003 he was elected as president of the then Labour Party, and during his tenure, he oversaw various structural reforms, including the introduction of a statute in 2008 that revitalized and modernized the political party.

In June 2017, Zrinzo Azzopardi was elected as a Member of Parliament for the 5th Electoral District. He served as Chairman on the Adjunct Consideration of Bills Committee, and as a member of the Economic and Financial Affairs Committee, the Foreign and European Affairs Committee, and the National Audit Office Accounts Committee. He also forms part of Malta’s Parliamentary Delegation to the Council of Europe Parliamentary Assembly and the OSCE Parliamentary Assembly.

In January 2020, Zrinzo Azzopardi was appointed as the Parliamentary Secretary responsible for European Funds, a Secretariat which now forms part of the Office of the Prime Minister

Personal life 
Stefan Zrinzo Azzopardi is married to Silvana, with whom he has two children.

References 

1973 births
Living people
Maltese politicians